Erwin Schrott (born 21 December 1972 in Montevideo, Uruguay) is an operatic bass-baritone, particularly known for his interpretation of the Title role in Mozart's Don Giovanni.

Career
Schrott studied singing with Franca Mattiucci. He made his professional debut in Montevideo at the age of 22, singing Roucher in Andrea Chénier. Following a stint at the Teatro Municipal in Santiago, Chile, where he sang Timur in Turandot, Colline in La bohème, Sparafucile in Rigoletto and Ramfis in Aida, he won a scholarship to study in Italy.

After winning first prize (male singer) and the Audience Prize in the 1998 Operalia competition founded by Plácido Domingo, he went on to leading roles in major opera houses in both Europe and the United States. He made his debut at the Vienna State Opera as Banquo in Verdi's Macbeth on 28 March 1999 and returned there to sing Leporello in Don Giovanni and Figaro in Le nozze di Figaro. At La Scala, he has sung the Title role in Don Giovanni and Pharaon in Moïse et Pharaon. His debut at the New York Metropolitan Opera came on 30 November 2000 when he sang Colline in La bohème. He returned to the company in 2005 as Escamillo in Carmen, in 2006 in the Title role in Don Giovanni for the Met's Japan Tour, in 2007 as Figaro in Le nozze di Figaro and in 2008 in the Title role in Don Giovanni. Since his debut at the Royal Opera House in September 2003 as Leporello in Don Giovanni, Schrott has sung Figaro in Le nozze di Figaro, and the Title role in Don Giovanni with the company. He sang the role of Escamillo (7 December 2009) in the production of Carmen conducted by Daniel Barenboim, with Jonas Kaufmann as Don Josè and Anita Rachvelishvili in the Title role, that opened the season at La Scala.

Schrott's performances on the concert stage include a joint concert with Anna Netrebko conducted by Plácido Domingo in the Centro de Bellas Artes, San Juan, Puerto Rico (9 October 2007), a gala concert for the 5th Abu Dhabi Music and Arts Festival, with Anna Netrebko and Elīna Garanča (29 March 2008), and a solo concert in the Münchner Residenz (9 November 2008).

In April 2008, concert promoter Ian Rosenblatt said that he was planning to sue Schrott for breach of contract when he cancelled his appearance in the Rosenblatt Recital Series for 11 June 2008 at Cadogan Hall. The dispute was settled out of court in August 2008 when Schrott agreed to make a donation to charity.

Personal life
Schrott was married in Uruguay and has a daughter, born in 1998. After the divorce, his wife and daughter stayed in Uruguay. He was for six years the partner of the Russian soprano Anna Netrebko. They never married, and in November 2013, Netrebko announced that she and Schrott had separated amicably. Their son, Tiago Aruã, was born on 5 September 2008 in Vienna. In addition to joint concerts in Puerto Rico, Abu Dhabi and Riga, Netrebko and Schrott appeared together in Don Giovanni with the New York Metropolitan Opera's Japan Tour in June 2006 and at the Royal Opera House in June 2007. 

Schrott is now married to Niyousha Nasri.

Awards and honors
 2018: Excelentia a la Cultura Prize 2018, La Fundación Excelencia – Spain<ref>"La Fundación Excelentia premia a Samsung, Gaes y Rolex, entre otros, con la IV edición de sus Premios a la Cultura", La Vanguardia, 20 May 2018</ref>
 2017: XXX International "Luigi Illica Prize" – Premio Illica, Italy
 2017: Goldenes Ehrenzeichen für Verdienste um die Republik Österreich – Grand golden medal of honor for services to the republic of Austria
2015: "Distinguished Citizen" from Montevideo
2012: Echo Klassik Award for his album Rojotango1998: First prize (male singer) and Audience prize Operalia competition founded by Plácido Domingo

 Repertoire 

 Bellini: Sir Giorgio and Riccardo Forth in I puritani Bellini: Rodolfo in La sonnambula Berlioz: Mephistopheles in La damnation de Faust Berlioz: Narbal in Les Troyens Bizet: Escamillo in Carmen Boito: Title role in Mefistofele Donizetti: Dulcamara in L’elisir d’amore Donizetti: Enrico VIII. in Anna Bolena Donizetti: Don Alfonso in Lucrezia Borgia Donizetti: Title role in Don Pasquale Gounod: Mephistopheles in Faust Mozart: Title role and Graf Almaviva in Le nozze di Figaro Mozart: Title role and Leporello in Don Giovanni Offenbach: Lindorf/Coppélius/Miracle in The Tales of Hoffmann Ponchielli: Alvise Badoero in La Gioconda Puccini: Scarpia in Tosca Puccini: Colline in La bohème Puccini: Timur in Turandot Rossini: Alidoro in La Cenerentola Rossini: Pharaon in Moïse et Pharaon Rossini: Selim in Il turco in Italia Rossini: Lindoro in L’italiana in Algeri Verdi: Banco in Macbeth Verdi: Ramfis in Aida Verdi: Procida in Les vêpres siciliennes Verdi: Title role in Attila Verdi: Pagano in I Lombardi alla prima crociataRecordingsLes vêpres siciliennes (Verdi) Royal Opera House, London, Production 2013/Release 2015, Antonio Pappano conducting. Warner Music Group, DVD & Blu-rayDon Giovanni (Mozart) Festspielhaus Baden-Baden, 2013, Thomas Hengelbrock conducting. Sony Classical, DVD & Blu-rayRojotango – Live in Berlin, 2013, Sony Classical, DVDArias – Erwin Schrott, 2012, Daniele Rustioni conducting. Sony Classical, CDRojotango – Erwin Schrott, Tango CD, 2011, with Pablo Ziegler. Sony Classical, CDDon Giovanni (Mozart) Salzburg Festival recorded in 2008, 2010, Bertrand de Billy conducting. Naxos Germany, DVDLe nozze di Figaro (Mozart) Opernhaus Zürich, 2009, Franz Welser-Möst conducting. EMI Music, DVDArias by Mozart, Verdi, Berlioz, Gounod & Meyerbeer, 2008, Orquestra de la Comunitat Valenciana, Riccardo Frizza conducting. Decca CDLe nozze di Figaro (Mozart) Royal Opera House, 2008, Antonio Pappano conducting. Opus Arte, DVD & Blu-rayMoïse et Pharaon (Pharaon), Teatro alla Scala, 2003, Riccardo Muti conducting. TDK DVDL'elisir d'amore (Dulcamara), Macerata Opera Festival, 2002,  conducting. Rai Trade DVD and CD

References

Sources

Further reading
Battle, Laura, "Interview: Erwin Schrott" Music OMH, June 2007. Accessed 15 June 2007.
Brotons Ibáñez, R., "Erwin Schrott: «Accidentes como este pasan en todos los teatros»" Levante'', 12 December 2006 (in Spanish). Accessed 15 June 2007.

External links

Official web site (accessed 30 June 2008)
erwinschrott.wordpress.com (accessed 5 February 2008)
Erwin Schrott biography on Opera Art Artists Management. (accessed 5 February 2008)
New York Metropolitan Interview, October 2007. (accessed 5 February 2008)

1972 births
Living people
Operatic bass-baritones
Operalia, The World Opera Competition prize-winners
Singers from Montevideo
21st-century Uruguayan male singers
Uruguayan opera singers
Uruguayan people of German descent